Luis Eduardo García Carmona (born September 28, 1994, in Guadalajara, Jalisco) is a professional Mexican footballer who currently plays for Alacranes de Durango.

References

External links
 
 

Living people
1994 births
Mexican footballers
Association football midfielders
Club Tijuana footballers
Dorados de Sinaloa footballers
Tuxtla F.C. footballers
Coras de Nayarit F.C. footballers
Alacranes de Durango footballers
Ascenso MX players
Liga Premier de México players
Tercera División de México players
Footballers from Guadalajara, Jalisco